Carlo Curis (2 November 1923 – 29 September 2014) was an Italian prelate of the Catholic Church.

Biography
Curis was born in La Maddalena, Italy, and ordained priest on 13 July 1947.

Curis was appointed Titular Archbishop of Medeli as well as Apostolic Delegate to Sri Lanka on 14 July 1971. He was consecrated on 3 October 1971.

Curis was appointed Apostolic Pro-Nuncio to Sri Lanka (1971), to Nigeria (1978), and to Cyprus (1984) as well as Apostolic Delegate to Jerusalem and Palestine on 4 February 1984. He was appointed Pro-Nuncio to Canada on 28 March 1990.

He retired upon the appointment of Paolo Romeo to succeed him on 5 February 1999.

References

External links
Catholic-Hierarchy

Apostolic Nuncios to Israel
Apostolic Nuncios to Canada
Apostolic Nuncios to Sri Lanka
Apostolic Nuncios to Nigeria
Apostolic Nuncios to Cyprus
20th-century Italian Roman Catholic titular archbishops
1923 births
2014 deaths
People from La Maddalena
Italian expatriates in Nigeria
Italian expatriates in Cyprus
Italian expatriates in Sri Lanka
Italian expatriates in Israel